The Western Australian Music Industry Awards (commonly known as WAMis) are annual awards presented to the local contemporary music industry, put on by the Western Australian Music Industry Association Inc (WAM). The WAMi Awards are Western Australia Music's night of nights, bringing together local music fans and members of local, national and international industry to acknowledge and celebrate another year of achievements for Western Australia.

History
WAM was originally formed as the Western Australian Rock Music Industry Association Inc. (WARMIA) in 1985, with its main aim to develop and run annual awards recognising achievements within the music industry in Western Australia. WAM first received project funding from the state government in 1989, and in the early 1990s the word "rock" was dropped from the title to give the organisation scope to take on a broader constituency.

In 1994 the inaugural Kiss My WAMi Original Contemporary Music Festival was held. Other programs that have been successfully undertaken include the Act of Youth series of all-ages shows, the WA Song Contest (now WAM Song of the Year), Women in Rock and an annual CD compilation of Western Australian musical artists (the first "The Western Front" was undertaken in 1992 and featured The Pink Fluffy Bunnies, Allegiance and Storytime amongst others.)

The First West Australian Music Industry Awards occurred in 2001.

Hall of Fame Awards
The Hall of Fame recognises those members of the industry who have made an outstanding contribution to WA contemporary music over their career. Various WAM Awards of similar focus acknowledged this before the official WAM Hall of Fame awards came into being in 2004.

The following is an amalgamation of people who had been previously recognised through various WAM awards since 1985 and were inducted into the WAM Hall of Fame.

Golden Rock Award
 1985 - Joe Cipriani
 1989 - Brian Peacock
 1990 - Steve Gordon

Golden WAMi for Contribution to the Industry
 1991 - David Gerard
 1992 - Michael Dwyer
 1993 - Peter Woodward
 1994 - Mark Genge
 2000 - Brett Rowe
 2001 - Mark Genge
 2002 - Mark Genge
 2003 - Luke Rinaldi
 2007 - Peter Barr

Rock 'n' Roll of Renown
 1992 - Dave Warner
 1993 - John Meyer, Shirley Pochee, Anna Gare, Dom Mariani
 1994 - Kim Salmon, Suze DeMarchi, Steve Tallis, Lucky Oceans

Kiss My WAMi Award for Contribution to the Industry
 1994 - Richard Lane
 1995 - Bob Gordon
 1996 - RTRFM
 1997 - RTRFM
 1998 - RTRFM
 1999 - Bob Gordon

Hall of Fame
 2005 - Bon Scott (posthumous), Dave Hole, Martin Clarke 
 2006 - David McComb (posthumous), The Pigram Brothers, James Baker
 2007 - The Farriss Brothers
 2009 - Dave Faulkner
 2010 - Matt Taylor
 2011 - Shaun O'Callaghan (posthumous), The Waifs, Pete Carroll
 2012 - Tim Minchin, Robert Hunter (posthumous), Paul Bodlovich
 2013 - Ken 'Squasha' Knight
 2014 - Philip Stevens, Martyn P. Casey
 2015 - Paul Sloan, Helen Matthews
 2016 - Rick Steele, The Triffids
 2017 - Eurogliders, Graham Wood (posthumous)
 2018 - Dixie Battersby, The Stems
 2019 - Johnny Young, The Scientists

2001 Awards
The 2001 WAMi Awards commenced with an opening party on Thursday 13 September 2001 and a closing party at the Globe Theatre on Sunday 16 September 2001.

 Most Popular Local Original Recorded Release - Half Deserted Streets by Fourth Floor Collapse
 Most Popular Original Song - "Wake Up" by Eskimo Joe
 Most Popular Venue for Local Original Music - Amplifier Bar
 Most Popular Local Original Music Radio Program - Genge and Barr Breakfast Show RTRFM
 Most Popular Reviewer - Julian Tompkin (X-Press)
 Most Popular Local Original Band Website - Fourth Floor Collapse
 Most Promising New Local Original Band - The Fergusons
 Most Popular Local Original Music Fanzine Website - Popstar
 Most Popular Local Original Music Video - "Wake Up" by Eskimo Joe
 Most Popular Local Original Music Television Programme - 'Klipart' Access 31
 Most Popular Local Original CD Launch - The Fergusons
 Best Live Sound Engineer - Ian Stuart
 Best Sound Recording Engineer - Ben Glatzer
 Best Record Producer - Ben Glatzer
 Best Lighting Engineer - Jared Hawke
 Best Band Photographer - Chris O'Halloran
 Most Popular Local Original Band - Jebediah
 Most Popular Male Original Bass Player - Louis Dunstan (Jed Whitey)
 Most Popular Female Original Bass Player - Kelly Campbell (Showbag!)
 Most Popular Male Original Instrumentalist - Nathan Gaunt (Nathan Gaunt Band)
 Most Popular Female Original Instrumentalist - Melanie Robinson (Myrtle)
 Most Popular Male Original Guitarist - Nathan Gaunt (Nathan Gaunt Band)

 Most Popular Female Original Guitarist - Kate Andrews (Subject To Flooding)
 Most Popular Male Original Vocalist - Michael Miller (Fourth Floor Collapse)
 Most Popular Female Original Vocalist - Laura G (Purrvert)
 Most Popular Male Original Drummer - Daniel Salter (Jed Whitey)
 Most Popular Female Original Drummer - Belle Verdiglione (Plump)
 Most Popular Original Indie Act - The Fergusons
 Most Popular Original Country Act - The Sleepy Jackson
 Most Popular Original Blues Act - Dave Hole
 Most Popular Original Aboriginal Music Act - Kerri-Anne Cox
 Most Popular Original Jazz Act - Hip Mo Toast
 Most Popular Original World Music Act - African Music Congress
 Most Popular Original Folk Act - B Movie Heroes
 Most Popular Original Goth/Industrial Act - Cell 7
 Most Popular Original Funk Act - Showbag!
 Most Popular Original Punk Act - Capital City
 Most Popular Original Pop Act - Rollerskates
 Most Popular Original Rock Act - Fourth Floor Collapse
 Most Popular Original Electronic Act - Downsyde
 Most Popular Original Metal Act - Karnivool
 Most Popular Original Acoustic Act - B Movie Heroes

2002 Awards

 Most Popular Local Original Album - Eskimo Joe - Girl
 Most Popular Local Original Single/EP - The Panics - The Panics
 Most Promising New Band - The Panics
 Most Popular Original Local Music Video - Rollerskates - "The Movement"
 Favourite CD Launch - Rhibosome
 Favourite Venue for Local Original Music - Grosvenor Hotel
 Best Local Original Music Website - Perthbands
 Most Popular Local Music Radio Program - Breakfast - RTRFM
 Most Popular Local Aboriginal Music Act - Kross Kulcha
 Most Popular Local Original Blues Act - Nathan Gaunt and the Black Eyed Dogs
 Most Popular Local Original Indie Act - The Fergusons
 Most Popular Local Original Jazz Act - Hip Mo Toast
 Best Reviewer - Julian Tompkin - X Press
 Best Record Producer - Shaun O'Callaghan
 Best Sound Recording Engineer - Shaun O'Callaghan
 Best Live Sound Engineer - Ian Stuart
 Best Lighting Engineer - Jared Hawke
 Best Band Photographer - Chris O'Halloran
 Most Popular Local Original Band - Eskimo Joe
 Most Popular Local Original Electronic Act - Rhibosome
 Most Popular Local Original Pop Act - The Fergusons

 Most Popular Local Original Rock Act - Fourth Floor Collapse
 Most Popular Local Original Country Act - The Automasters
 Most Popular Local Original Punk Act - Gyroscope
 Most Popular Local Original Folk Act - John Butler Trio
 Most Popular Local Original Funk Act - Rollerskates
 Most Popular Local Original Metal Act - Karnivool
 Most Popular Local Original World Music Act - African Music Congress
 Most Popular Male Original Vocalist - John Butler(John Butler Trio)
 Most Popular Female Original Vocalist - Laura G (Purrvert)
 Most Popular Male Original Bass Player - Mark Cruickshank (Red Jezebel)
 Most Popular Female Original Bass Player - Vanessa Thornton (Jebediah)
 Most Popular Male Original Drummer - Tom Brownrigg (Local Pricks)
 Most Popular Female Original Drummer - Kate Read (Jonas)
 Most Popular Male Original Guitarist - John Butler (John Butler Trio)
 Most Popular Female Original Guitarist - Tash Sayers (Local Pricks)
 Most Popular Male Original Instrumentalist - Stevie C (Rollerskates)
 Most Popular Female Original Instrumentalist - Mel Robinson (Myrtle/Gata Negra)
 Best Reviewer - Julian Tompkin - X Press
 Best Record Producer  - Shaun O'Callaghan
 Best Sound Recording Engineer - Shaun O'Callaghan

2003 Awards
WAM's annual original contemporary music festival celebrated its 10th birthday in 2003. The metro component of the Kiss My WAMi Festival ran from Thursday 4 September through to Sunday 14 September 2004.

Public voted awards
 Most Popular Local Original Act - The Panics
 Most Popular Local Original Album - Downsyde - Land of the Giants
 Most Popular Local Original Live Act - Karnivool
 Most Popular Local Original New Act - Little Birdy
 Most Popular Local Original Indigenous Act - Gina Williams
 Most Popular Local Original Music Video - Downsyde - ("El Questro")
 Most Popular Local Original Music Website - Perthbands
 Most Popular Local Original Venue - Rosemount Hotel
 Most Popular Local Original Music Event -In The Pines
 Most Popular Local Original Indie Rock Act - The Fergusons
 Most Popular Local Original Urban Music Act - Downsyde
 Most Popular Local Original Jazz Act - Hip Mo Toast
 Most Popular Local Original Male Vocalist - Nathan Gaunt 
 Most Popular Local Original Female Vocalist - Katy Steele 
 Most Popular Local Original Guitarist - Nathan Gaunt 
 Most Popular Local Original Instrumentalist - Stevie Callum (Rollerskates)
 Most Popular Local Original Single or EP - "Let Your Love Be Love" by The Sleepy Jackson 
 Most Popular Local Original Blues & Roots Act - John Butler Trio
 Most Popular Local Original World Music Act - B Movie Heroes
 Most Popular Local Original Country Act - Pete Stone & The Assistance
 Most Popular Local Original Electronic Producer - Soundlab
 Most Popular Local Original Live Electronic Act - Rhibosome
 Most Popular Local Original Heavy Rock Act - Karnivool
 Most Popular Local Original Bassist - Matt Geary (The Nordeens)
 Most Popular Local Original Drummer - Matt Maguire (Adam Said Galore)

Industry voted awards
 Golden WAMi For Contribution to the Industry - Luke Rinaldi
 Best Record Producer/Engineer -Shaun O'Callaghan
 Best Act Management - Phil Stevens Management
 Best Music Photographer - Chris O'Halloran
 Best Reviewer/Presenter (Media Award) - Mark Genge
 Best Live Sound Engineer - Ian Stuart
 Best Lighting Engineer - Jared Hawke

2004 Awards

2005 Awards
The 2005 WAMi Awards were held on Tuesday 22 February 2005, hosted by Triple J's Robbie Buck. The WAMi Awards were held in the beautiful outdoor setting of the Beck's Verandah, at the Perth Concert Hall. The stars were shining as award winners were presented their WAMi cakes. Jebediah, Carus, The Kill Devil Hills, Red Jezebel, Dom Mariani and the Majestic Kelp and The Panda Band performed live at the ceremony.  Inductees into the WAM Hall of Fame were Bon Scott (AC/DC), Martin Clarke and Dave Hole.

Public voted awards
 Most Popular Act - Eskimo Joe
 Most Popular Album - Eskimo Joe - A Song is a City
 Most Popular Single/EP - Eskimo Joe - "From the Sea"
 Most Popular Live Act - Eskimo Joe
 Favourite Newcomer - Snowman
 Most Popular Music Video - Little Birdy - "Beautiful To Me"
 Most Popular Music Website - Perthbands
 Most Popular Music Venue - Rosemount Hotel
 Most Popular Music Event - Big Day Out

Industry voted awards

General awards
 Golden WAMi for contribution to the WA Music industry in 2004 - Nigel Bird
 Most Promising New Act - The Panda Band
 Best Indigenous Act - The Pigram Brothers
 Media Award for outstanding contribution in 2004 - RTRFM
 Management Awards for outstanding achievements in 2004 by a Manager - Philip Stevens
 Best Live Sound Engineer - Gavin Tempany
 Best Record Producer/Engineer - Dave Parkin (Jebediah, Red Jezebel, Snowman)
 Best WA Based Record Label - Jarrah Records

Genre Category Awards
 Best Blues/Roots Act - The Kill Devil Hills
 Best Commercial Pop Act - Eskimo Joe
 Best Country Music Act - The Kill Devil Hills
 Best Funk Act - Dyslexic Fish
 Best Hard Rock/Metal Act - Karnivool
 Best Indie/Pop Act! - Eskimo Joe
 Best Jazz Act - Hip Mo Toast
 Best Live Electronic Act - Downsyde
 Best Punk Act - Gyroscope
 Best Rock Act - End of Fashion
 Best Urban Music Act - Downsyde
 Best World Music Act - B Movie Heroes

Craft Category Awards
 Best Male Vocalist - Nathan Gaunt (Nathan Gaunt & The Blackeyed Dogs)
 Best Female Vocalist - Katy Steele (Little Birdy)
 Best Guitarist - Nathan Gaunt (Nathan Gaunt & The Blackeyed Dogs)
 Best Drummer - Angus Diggs (Monkey Boy)
 Best Electronic Producer - Lo-Key Fu
 Best Bassist - Vanessa Thornton (Jebediah)
 Best Instrumentalist - Kathy Potter
 Best DJ - Greg Packer

2006 Awards
The 2006 WAMi Awards were held on Tuesday 21 February 2006 on the Becks Verandah at the Perth Concert Hall, hosted again by Robbie Buck (from Triple J).  The awards featured performances by The Panics, Snowman, The Fuzz and Schvendes plus a surprise special guest performance from John Butler.  Inductions into the WAM Hall of Fame were Stephen and Alan Pigram (The Pigram Brothers), James Baker (Hoodoo Gurus, The Scientists, Beasts of Bourbon and The Manikins) and David McComb (The Triffids/The Blackeyed Susans).

Public voted awards
 Most Popular Act - Eskimo Joe
 Most Popular Album - Gyroscope - Are You Involved?
 Most Popular Single/EP - Schvendes - "Turn Out Your Lights"
 Most Popular Live Act - Gyroscope
 Favourite Newcomer - Eleventh He Reaches London
 Most Popular Music Video - End of Fashion - "O Yeah"
 Most Popular Music Website - Perthbands
 Most Popular Music Venue - Rosemount Hotel
 Most Popular Music Event - Big Day Out

Industry voted awards

General awards
 Golden WAMi for contribution to the local music industry - Luke Rinaldi
 Management Award for outstanding achievement - Philip Stevens
 Media Award for outstanding contribution - RTRFM
 Best Record Producer/Engineer - Dave Parkin (Jebediah, Red Jezebel, Snowman)
 Best Live Sound Engineer - Michael ‘Fletch’ Fletcher 
 Best WA Record Label - Jarrah Records
 Most Promising New Act - Schvendes
 Best Indigenous Act - Richard Walley

Genre category awards
 Best Indie/Pop Act - The Panda Band
 Best Rock Act - Gyroscope
 Best Hard Rock/Metal Act - Karnivool
 Best Punk Act - Gyroscope
 Best Commercial Pop Act - Eskimo Joe
 Best Urban Music Act - Downsyde
 Best Blues/Roots Act - The Kill Devil Hills
 Best Jazz Act - Hip Mo Toast
 Best World Music Act - B Movie Heroes
 Best Country Music Act - The Kill Devil Hills
 Best Funk Act - Bobby Blackbird and the Bluejays
 Best Live Electronic Act - Astronaut

Craft Category Awards
 Best Electronic Producer - Pendulum
 Best Guitarist - Drew Goddard (Karnivool)
 Best Female Vocalist - Katy Steele (Little Birdy)
 Best Instrumentalist - Tristen Parr (Schvendes, Fall Electric)
 Best Bassist -Ben Franz (The Waifs)
 Best Drummer - Gabriel Nicotra (The Panda Band, Rollerskates)
 Best DJ - Greg Packer
 Best Male Vocalist - Andy Citawarman (Snowman)

2007 Awards
The 2007 WAMi Awards were held on Wednesday 21 February 2007 co-hosted by Triple J's Robbie Buck and Rosie Beaton. The WAMi Awards saw a return to the Beck's Verandah, at the Perth Concert Hall and after years of presenting cakes to WAMi Award winners, 2007 sees the winners presented with a WAMington. Eskimo Joe gave a special acoustic performance with performances by Little Birdy, Dave Hole, The Stems and WAMi nominees Double Entendre. The Farris Brothers (Andrew, Tim and Jon) were inducted into the WAM Hall of Fame.

Public voted awards
 Most Popular Act - Karnivool
 Most Popular Album - Snowman
 Most Popular Single/EP - Eskimo Joe - "Black Fingernails, Red Wine"
 Most Popular Live Act - Karnivool
 Favourite Newcomer - Birds of Tokyo
 Most Popular Music Video - Snowman - "You Are A Casino"
 Most Popular Music Website - Perthbands.com
 Most Popular Music Venue - Amplifier Bar
 Most Popular Music Event - Big Day Out

Industry Awards
 Most Promising New Act - Mink Mussel Creek
 Best Record Producer/Engineer - Dave Parkin
 Media Award-Individual - Bob Gordon
 Best Male Vocalist - Ian Kenny (Karnivool/Birds of Tokyo)
 Best Female Vocalist - Abbe May (The Fuzz)
 Best Guitarist - Drew Goddard (Karnivool)
 Best Bassist - Ben Franz
 Best Drummer - Rob Nassif (Gyroscope)
 Best Instrumentalist - Tristan Parr (Schvendes)
 Best Electronic Producer - Pendulum
 Best Blues/Roots Act - The Kill Devil Hills
 Best Country Music Act - The Jayco Brothers
 Best Rock Act - Snowman 
 Best Indi Pop Act - The Bank Holidays
 Best Indigenous Act - The Pigram Brothers
 Management Award - Heath Bradby
 Media Award-Organisation - RTRFM 
 Best DJ - Dan the Man
 Best Hardcore/Punk Act - Eleventh He Reaches London
 Best Hard Rock Metal Act - Karnivool
 Best Commercial Pop Act - Eskimo Joe
 Best Jazz Act - VOID
 Best WA Record Label - Jarrah Records
 Best Sound Engineer - Dave Parkin
 Best Urban/ Hip Hop Act - Downsyde
 Best Live Electronic Act - Pendulum
 Best Funk Act - Bobby Blackbird and the Bluejays
 Best World Act - Double Entendre

2008 Awards
The 2008 WAMi Awards were held at the Perth Festival Beck's Music Box (on the Esplanade, Perth) on Thursday 21 February 2008. The event was co-hosted by Caroline Tran and Peter Barr. The WAMi Awards night included live performances by Jebediah, Birds of Tokyo, Blue Shaddy, Yabu Band with special guests Groovylips and the Yang, Felicity Groom and the Black Black Smoke and DJ's Dan the Man & Rok Riley. The WAM Hall of Fame, was not part of the ceremony, with the executive director of WAM, Paul Bodlovich, announcing that WAM were planning to hold a separate Hall of Fame event later in the year.  The winners of the 2008 WAMi's were:

Public voted awards
 Most Popular Act - The Panics
 Most Popular Music Website - Perthbands
 Most Popular Live Act - Karnivool
 Most Popular Single/EP - Gyroscope – "Snakeskin"
 Most Popular Album - Birds of Tokyo – Day One
 Favourite Newcomer - Harlequin League
 Most Popular Music Video - Gyroscope – "Snakeskin"'
 Most Popular Music Event - Southbound
 Most Popular Venue - Amplifier Bar

Industry voted awards
 Most Promising New Act - Abbe May and the Rockin' Pneumonia
 Best Sound Engineer (Live or Studio) - George Kailis
 Best Record Producer/Engineer - Dave Parkin
 Best WA Record Label - Jarrah Records
 Media Award Individual - Dave Cutbush
 Media Award Organisation - RTRFM 92.1
 Management Award - Steph Edwardes
 Best Rock Act - Birds of Tokyo
 Best Commercial Pop Act - The Panics
 Best Indie Pop Act - Institut Polaire
 Best Hardcore/Punk Act - The Homicides
 Best Hard Rock/Metal Act - Karnivool
 Best Blues/Roots Act - The Kill Devil Hills
 Best Funk Act - The Bluejays
 Best Jazz Act - Void
 Best Country Music Act - The Kill Devil Hills
 Best Urban/ Hip Hop Act - Downsyde
 Best Electronic Act - Pendulum
 Best DJ - Dan the Man
 Best World Act - The Flying Carpathians
 Best Indigenous Act - The Pigram Brothers
 Best Electronic Producer - Pendulum
 Best Bassist - Roy Martinez 
 Best Guitarist - Ant Gray (Schvendes)
 Best Male Vocalist - Brendon Humphries (The Kill Devil Hills)
 Best Female Vocalist. - Abbe May (Abbe May and The Rockin' Pneumonia)
 Best Drummer - Pete Guazzelli 
 Best Instrumentalist - Tristan Parr (Schvendes, Fall Electric)

2009 Awards
The 2009 WAMi Awards were held at the Metro City Nightclub on Thursday 7 May 2009, with the event hosted by Tex Perkins. The WAMi Awards night included live performances by Drapht, The Kill Devil Hills, Djva, Project Mayhem and the Sneaky Weasel Gang. Dave Faulkner was inducted into the WAM Hall of Fame.

Public voted awards
 Most Popular Act - Birds of Tokyo
 Most Popular Live Act - Birds of Tokyo
 Most Popular Album - Birds of Tokyo - Universes
 Most Popular Single/EP - Tame Impala - Tame Impala
 Favourite Newcomer - Tame Impala
 Most Popular Music Video - Downsyde - "Fortune and Fame"
 Most Popular Music Event - Southbound
 Most Popular Music Venue - Fly by Night Musicians Club
 Most Popular Music Website - www.fasterlouder.com.au (Perth)

Industry voted awards
 Golden WAMi - Kristy Pinder
 Most Promising New Act - Tame Impala
 Best Male Vocalist - Ian Kenny
 Best Female Vocalist - Abbe May
 Best Guitarist - Luke Dux
 Best Bassist - Ryan Dux
 Best Drummer - Matt Maguire
 Best Instrumentalist - Alex Archer
 Best Electronic Producer - Tomás Ford
 Best DJ - Dan The Man
 Best Rock Act - Birds of Tokyo
 Best Commercial Pop Act - The Panics
 Best Indie Pop Act
 Best Hardcore / Punk Act - The Painkillers
 Best Hard Rock / Metal Act - The Devil Rides Out
 Best Blues / Roots Act - Abbe May and the Rockin' Pneumonia
 Best Funk Act - Sneaky Weasel Gang
 Best Jazz Act - VOID
 Best Country Music Act - The Kill Devil Hills
 Best Urban/Hip Hop Act - Drapht
 Best Live Electronic Act - Pendulum
 Best World Act - Grace Barbé
 Best Live Sound Engineer - Dave Carter
 Best Record Producer/Engineer - Dave Parkin - Blackbird Studio
 Indigenous Act of the Year - Yabu Band
 Best WA based Record Label - Good Cop Bad Cop Records
 Media Award (Individual) - Bob Gordon
 Media Award (Organisation) - RTRFM
 Management Award - Jodie Regan

2010 Awards
The 2010 WAMi Awards were announced Thursday 20 May 2010 at Capitol Nightclub, Perth, with the event hosted by Lindsay McDougall and Peter Barr. The WAMi Awards night included live performances by Sugar Army, Will Stoker and the Embers, the Brow Horn Orchestra, Black Poet and Hayley Beth.

Public voted awards
 Most Popular Act - Birds of Tokyo
 Most Popular Live Act - Karnivool
 Most Popular Music Website - Fasterlouder.com.au
 Most Popular Album - Karnivool – Sound Awake
 Favourite Newcomer - The Joe Kings
 Most Popular Music Venue - Amplifier Bar
 Most Popular Single / EP - French Rockets / Injured Ninja – "12" Split + DVD
 Most Popular Music Video - Blac Blocs - "NVDA"
 Most Popular Music Event - Soundwave (Perth)

Industry Awards
 Most Promising New Act - Emperors
 Best Live Sound Engineer - Dave Carter
 Best Record Producer / Engineer - Dave Parkin
 Indigenous Act of the Year - Yabu Band
 Best WA Based Record Label - Good Cop Bad Cop
 Media Award, Individual - Dave Cutbush
 Media Award, Organisation - RTRFM
 Management Award - Steph Edwardes
 Best Male Vocalist - Ian Kenny
 Best Female Vocalist - Abbe May
 Best Guitarist - Luke Dux
 Best Bassist - Ryan Dux
 Best Drummer - Adam Weston
 Best Instrumentalist - Alex Archer
 Best Electronic Producer - Tomás Ford
 Best DJ - Charlie Bucket'
 Best Rock Act - The Kill Devil Hills
 Best Commercial Pop Act - Eskimo Joe
 Best Indie Pop Act - Felicity Groom and the Black Black Smoke
 Best Hardcore / Punk Act - Project Mayhem
 Best Hard Rock / Metal Act - Eleventh He Reaches London
 Best Blues / Roots Act - Abbe May
 Best Funk Act - The Brow Horn Orchestra
 Best Jazz Act - The Graham Wood Trio
 Best Country Music Act - The Fancy Brothers
 Best Urban Hip Hop Act - The Typhoons
 Best World Act - Grace Barbé

2011 Awards
The 2011 WAMi Awards were announced on 28 May 2011 at The Bakery, James Street Northbridge, with the event hosted by Dylan Lewis and Dom Alessio. Record producer and engineer, the late Shaun O'Callaghan, The Waifs and Pete Carroll (former RTRFM manager and manager The Panics) were all inducted into the WAM Hall of Fame. The winners are listed below

Public voted awards 
 Most Popular Act - Tame Impala
 Most Popular Live Act - Tame Impala
 Most Popular Website - FasterLouder
 Most Popular Album - Birds of Tokyo by Birds of Tokyo
 Favourite Newcomer - Split Seconds 
 Most Popular Music Venue - The Rosemount Hotel 
 Most Popular Music Event - St Jeromes Laneway 
 Most Popular Single / EP - She's Like a Comet by Jebediah
 Most Popular Music Video - "Don't You Wanna Sing Forever" by The Brow Horn Orchestra

Industry voted awards 
Most Promising New Act - Split Seconds
Best Rock Act- Tame Impala 
Best Hardcore / Punk Act - Injured Ninja
Best Hard Rock / Metal Act - Eleventh He Reaches London 
Best Funk Act - Boom! Bap! Pow!
Best Urban / Hip Hop Act - Drapht
Best Blues & Roots Act - Abbe May
Best Jazz Act - Jack Doepel Quartet
Best World Act - Grace Barbé
Best Country Music Act - Ruby Boots
Best Indigenous Act- Yabu Band 
Best Electronic Music Act - Tim & Jean
Best Indie Pop Act - Split Second
Best Commercial Pop - Felicity Groom & Tim & Jean (First category tie in WAMi Award history **) 
Best WA Based Record Label - Jarrah Records
Media Award - Individual - Aarom Wilson
Media Award - Organisation - RTRfm 92.1
Management Award - Luke Rinaldi 
GOLDEN WAMi - Luke Rinaldi - winner

Craft awards 
Best Live Sound Engineer - Luke Willott
Best Record Producer / Engineer - Dave Parkin 
Best Male Vocalist - Sean Pollard
Best Female Vocalist - Abbe May 
Best Guitarist - Kevin Parker
Best Bassist - Rob Stephens
Best Drummer - Todd Pickett 
Best Instrumentalist - Glen Sarangapany
Best Electronic Producer - Tomás Ford 
Best DJ - Rok Riley

2012 Awards
The 2012 WAMi Awards were announced on 2 June 2012 at The Bakery, James Street Northbridge, with the event hosted by Claire Hooper and Dom Alessio. Comedian Tim Minchin, the late Robert Hunter, and the former CEO of WAM, Paul Bodlovich, were inducted into the WAM Hall of Fame. The winners were:

Public voted awards 
Most Popular Group - San Cisco
Most Popular Live Act - Abbe May
Most Popular Solo Artist - Abbe May
Most Popular Music Website - FasterLouder 
2012 Breakthrough Act - San Cisco
Most Popular Music Venue - The Bakery 
Most Popular Single - "Awkward" by San Cisco
Most Popular Music Video - "Awkward" by San Cisco
Most Popular Album / EP - Awkward EP by San Cisco
Most Popular Music Event - RTRfm's In the Pines

Industry voted awards 
Most Promising New Act - Sonpsilo Circus
Rock Act of the Year - Abbe May
Pop Act of the Year - San Cisco
Experimental Act of the Year - Tangled Thoughts of Leaving & Usurper of Modern Medicine 
Hardcore Punk Act of the Year - Project Mayhem 
Metal Act of the Year - Drowning Horse 
Blues Act of the Year - Abbe May
Folk Act of the Year - Ruby Boots
Acoustic Roots Act of the Year - Ruby Boots
Funk Act of the Year - The Brow Horn Orchestra

Craft awards 
Live Sound Engineer of the Year - Stu McLaughlin 
Recording Engineer of the Year - Dave Parkin
Guitarist of the Year - Doug May 
Bassist of the Year - Nick Gardener 
Drummer/Percussionist of the Year - Scarlett Stevens
Keys/Synth Artist of the Year - Jack Doepel 
Multi-Instrumentalist of the Year - Todd Pickett
Male Vocalist of the Year - Sean Pollard
Female Vocalist of the Year - Abbe May
Electronic Producer of the Year - Diger Rokwell
DJ of the Year - Rok Riley
Jazz Act of the Year - Jack Doepel Quartet
Hip Hop Act of the Year - Mathas
Dance/Electronic Act of the Year - Voltaire Twins
Country Music Act of the Year - Ruby Boots
World Music Act of the Year - Grace Barbé 
Indigenous Artist of the Year - Yabu Band
WA Record Label of the Year - Spinning Top Records
 2012 Media Award - Individual - Aarom Wilson (Drum Media)
 2012 Media Award - Organisation - RTRfm 
 2012 Management Award - Phil Stevens

2013 Awards
The 2013 Awards took place on 8 November 2013. The winners from the 2013 WAMi Awards were

Public voted awards 
 Group of the Year - Tame Impala
 Solo Artists of the Year - Abbe May 
 Record Store of the Year - 78 Records  
 Most Popular Venue - The Astor Theatre 
 Most Popular Event - St. Jerome's Laneway Festival 
 Album of the Year - Lonerism by Tame Impala
 Single of the Year - "Feels Like We Only Go Backwards" by Tame Impala
 Music Video of the Year - "Elephant" by Tame Impala

Industry voted awards 
 Best Blues / Roots Act - Morgan Bain
 Best Country Act - Ruby Boots 
 Best Electronic Act - Diger Rokwell
 Best Experimental Act - Kučka
 Best Folk Act - Mama Kin and Timothy Nelson & The Infidels
 Best Indigenous Act - Gina Williams
 Best Jazz Artists - Graham Wood
 Best Metal / Heavy Act - Karnivool
 Best Pop Act - Rainy Day Women
 Best Punk Act - Chainsaw Hookers
 Best Rock Act - The Love Junkies
 Best Urban Act - Mathas
 Best World Act - Grace Barbé
 Breakthrough Act - The Love Junkies
 Management Award - Luke Rinaldi
 Label of the Year - Walking Horse Music
 Media Award - Adam Trainer (RTRFM)
 Golden WAMi - Andrew Ryan

Craft awards 
 Sound Engineer (live) of the Year - Luke Gray & Adam Round 
 Sound Engineer (studio) of the Year - Dave Parkin 
 Record Producer of the Year - 
 Electronic Producer of the Year - Ta-ku 
 Multi Instrumentalist of the Year - Todd Pickett 
 Female Vocalist of the Year - Abbe May
 Male Vocalist of the Year - Ian Kenny 
 Guitarist of the Year - Luke Dux 
 Bassist of the Year - Ryan Dux 
 Drummer of the Year - Lewis Walsh
 Keys / Synth of the Year - Jack Doepel

2014 Awards
The 2014 Awards took place on 7 November 2014. The winners from the 2014 WAMi Awards were

Public voted awards 
 Most Popular Act - Pond
 Most Popular New Act - Hideous Sun Demon
 Most Popular Live Act - Pond
 Most Popular Video - "Only One" by John Butler Trio
 Most Popular Venue - Mojos Bar
 Most Popular Event - St. Jerome's Laneway Festival

Industry voted awards 
 Best Blues / Roots Act - The Floors 
 Best Country Act - Ruby Boots
 Best Electronic Act - Kučka
 Best Experimental Act - Kučka
 Best Folk Act - David Craft
 Best Indigenous Act - Gina Williams & Guy Ghouse
 Best Jazz Artists - Tom O'Halloran 
 Best Metal / Heavy Act - Puck
 Best Pop Act - Timothy Nelson & The Infidels
 Best Punk Act - Scalphunter
 Best Rock Act - The Love Junkies 
 Best Urban Act - Mathas
 Best World Act - The Weapon Is Sound
 Breakthrough Act - Mt. Mountain
 Best Album - Terror Terror, Hide It Hide It by Timothy Nelson & The Infidels
 Best Single - "Unconditional " by Kučka
 Management Award - Jodie Regan
 Media Award - Peter Barr (RTRFM)
 Golden WAMi - Jodie Regan

Craft awards 
 Best Sound Engineer (live) - Chris Wright
 Best Sound Engineer (studio) - Adam Round  
 Best Record Producer - Diger Rokwell
 Best Electronic Producer - Regan Mathews
 Best Female Vocalist - Abbe May
 Best Male Vocalist - Timothy Nelson
 Best Guitarist - Luke Dux 
 Best Bassist - Ryan Dux 
 Best Drummer - Lewis Walsh 
 Best Keys / Synth - Timothy Nelson

2015 Awards
The 2015 Awards took place on 5 November 2015. The winners from the 2015 WAMi Awards were

Public voted awards 
 Most Popular Act - Tame Impala
 Most Popular New Act - Koi Child 
 Most Popular Live Act - Tame Impala
 Most Popular Video - "Let It Happen" by Tame Impala
 Most Popular Venue - Mojos Bar
 Most Popular Event - St. Jerome's Laneway Festival

Industry voted awards 
 Best Blues / Roots Act - Morgan Bain 
 Best Country Act - Ruby Boots
 Best Electronic Act - Kučka
 Best Experimental Act - Kučka
 Best Folk Act - Jacob Diamond
 Best Indigenous Act - Gina Williams & Guy Ghouse
 Best Jazz Artists - Ben Vanderwal 
 Best Metal / Heavy Act - Voyager
 Best Pop Act - Methyl Ethel
 Best Punk Act - Scalphunter
 Best Rock Act - Tired Lion 
 Best Urban Act - Coin Banks
 Best World Act - Grace Barbé
 Best Album - Currents by Tame Impala
 Best EP - Figurine  by Tired Lion
 Best Single - "Twilight Driving" by Methyl Ethel
 Best Record Label - Spinning Top 
 Management Award - Jacob Snell
 Media Award - Bob Gordon (X-Press Magazine)
 Golden WAMi - Andrew Ryan

2016 Awards
The 2016 Awards took place in November 2016. The winners from the 2016 WAMi Awards were

Public voted awards 
 Most Popular Act - Koi Child
 Most Popular New Act - POW! Negro
 Most Popular Live Act - POW Negro
 Most Popular Video - "1-5-9" by Koi Child
 Most Popular Venue - Mojos Bar
 Most Popular Event - Camp Doogs

Industry voted awards 
 Best Blues / Roots Act - Old Blood
 Best Country Act - Ruby Boots
 Best Electronic Act - Slumberjack
 Best Experimental Act - Eduardo Cossio
 Best Folk Act - Lucy Peach
 Best Indigenous Act - Gina Williams
 Best Jazz Artists - Daniel Susnjar Afro-Peruvian Jazz Group
 Best Metal / Heavy Act - Voyager
 Best Pop Act - Methyl Ethel
 Best Punk Act - Scalphunter
 Best Rock Act - Tired Lion
 Best Urban Act - Koi Child & Mathas
 Best World Act - Grace Barbé
 Best Album - Koi Child by Koi Child
 Best EP - Open Plan Living by Verge Collection
 Best Single - "Doomsday Clock" by Abbe May
 Best Record Label - Pilerats
 Management Award - Jacob Snell
 Media Award - Caitlin Nienaber (RTRFM)
 Golden WAMi - Jacob Snell

Craft awards 
 Best Sound Engineer (live) - James Newhouse
 Best Sound Engineer (studio) - Dave Parkin 
 Best Record Producer - Joel Quartermain
 Best Electronic Producer - Regan Mathews
 Best Female Vocalist - Abbe May
 Best Male Vocalist - Jacob Diamond
 Best Guitarist - Benjamin Witt
 Best Bassist - Vanessa Thornton
 Best Drummer - Daniel Susnjar
 Best Keys / Synth - Timothy Nelson

2017 Awards
The 2017 Awards took place on 2 November 2017. The winners were:

Public voted awards 
 Most Popular Act - The Waifs
 Most Popular New Act - Stella Donnelly
 Most Popular Live Act - POW! Negro
 Most Popular Venue - Mojos Bar
 Most Popular Music Event - Falls Festival
 Most Popular Music video - "Medicine" by Peter Bibby

Genre and Industry awards 
 Best Album - Everything Is Forgotten by Methyl Ethel
 Best EP - Thrush Metal by Stella Donnelly
 Best Single - "Mechanical Bull" by Stella Donnelly
 Best Blues / Roots Act - Old Blood
 Best Country Act - The Little Lord Street Band
 Best Electronic Act (live) - Tobacco Rat
 Best Experimental Act - Furchick
 Best Folk Act - Stella Donnelly
 Best Hip-Hop Act - Ziggy Ramo
 Best Indigenous Act - Ziggy Ramo
 Best Jazz Act - Daniel Susnjar Afro-Peruvian Jazz Group
 Best Metal / Heavy Act - Tangled Thoughts of Leaving
 Best Pop Act - Methyl Ethel
 Best Punk / Hardcore Act - Nerve Quakes
 Best Regional Act - Carla Geneve
 Best Rock Act - Tired Lion
 Best Urban Act - POW! Negro
 Label of the Year - Good Company Records
 Industry Representative of the Year - Caitlin Nienabar
 Management Award - Phil Stevens
 Golden WAMi - Phaedra Watts

Craft awards 
 Best Bassist – Sara McPherson
 Best Brass/String/Woodwind Instrumentalist – Ricki Malet (Trumpet)
 Best Drummer/Percussionist – Nathan Sproule
 Best Electronic Producer – Feels
 Best Female Vocalist – Stella Donnelly
 Best Guitarist – Axel Carrington
 Best Keys/Synth Artist – Tom O'Halloran
 Best Male Vocalist – Jake Webb
 Best Sound Engineer (live) – Jeremy Beste
 Best Sound Engineer/Producer (studio) – Andy Lawson

2018 Awards
The 2018 Awards took place on 1 November 2018. The winners were:

Public voted awards 
 Most Popular Act - Tame Impala
 Most Popular New Act - Wooly Mammoth
 Most Popular Live Act - Psychedelic Porn Crumpets
 Most Popular Venue - Mojos Bar
 Most Popular Music Event - Falls Festival

Kiss My Camera Awards
Best Live Shot of a WA Act - Emanuel Rudnicki (The Southern River Band)
Best Live Shot of a Touring Act - Denis Radacic (The Butterfly Effect)
Best Press Shot of a WA Act - Matsu (Lincoln MacKinnon)

Genre and Industry awards 
 Best Album - Fruit by Abbe May
 Best EP - Magic Eye by Demon Days
 Best Single - "Greg's Discount Chemist" by Carla Geneve
 Best Music Video - "Social Candy" by Psychedelic Porn Crumpets
 Best Blues / Roots Act - Mama Kin Spender
 Best Country Act - The Little Lord Street Band
 Best Experimental Act - Eduardo Cossio and Louise Devenish
 Best Folk Act - Jacob Diamond
 Best Hip-Hop Act - Hyclass
 Best Indigenous Act - Gina Williams & Guy Ghouse
 Best Jazz Act - Alana Macpherson Nonet
 Best Live Electronic Act - Feels
 Best Metal / Heavy Act - Tangled Thoughts of Leaving
 Best Pop Act - Stella Donnelly
 Best Punk / Hardcore Act - Nerve Quakes
 Best Regional Act - Tracey Barnett
 Best Rock Act - Carla Geneve
 Best Urban Act - Sodette Mercy & Her Soul Atomics
 Best Work Act - Grace Barbé
 Label of the Year - Women of Music Production Perth
 Industry Representative of the Year - Caitlin Nienabar
 Golden WAMi - Caitlin Nienabar

Craft awards 
 Best Bassist – Jennifer Aslett and Roy Martinez
 Best Brass/String/Woodwind Instrumentalist – Alana Macpherson (Saxophone)
 Best Drummer/Percussionist – Daniel Susnjar
 Best Electronic Producer – Feels
 Best Guitarist – Jacob Diamond
 Best Keys/Synth Artist – Harry Mitchell
 Best Live Sound Engineer – Chris Wright
 Best Studio Sound Engineer/Producer – Matt Gio (Rada Studio) 
 Best Vocalist – Odette Mercy

2019 Awards
The 2019 Awards took place on 31 October 2019. The winners were:

Public voted awards 
 Most Popular Act - Dulcie
 Most Popular New Act - Dulcie
 Most Popular Live Act - Spacey Jane
 Most Popular Venue - Mojos Bar
 Most Popular Music Event - Falls Festival

Genre and Industry awards 
 Best Album - Beware of the Dogs by Stella Donnelly
 Best EP - Carla Geneve by Carla Geneve
 Best Single - "Things Change" by Carla Geneve 
 Best Music Video - "Bloom" by Jamilla
 Best Blues / Roots Act - Lincoln MacKinnon
 Best Country Act - The Little Lord Street Band
 Best Experimental Act - Eduardo Cossio
 Best Folk Act - Jack Davies & The Bush Chooks
 Best Hip-Hop Act - Hyclass
 Best Indigenous Act - The Struggling Kings
 Best Jazz Act - Harry Mitchell Quartet
 Best Live Electronic Act - Your Girl Pho
 Best Metal / Heavy Act - Tangled Thoughts of Leaving
 Best Pop Act - Stella Donnelly
 Best Punk / Hardcore Act - Sly Withers
 Best Regional Act - Blue Child Collective
 Best Rock Act - Carla Geneve
 Best Urban Act - Superego
 Best Work Act - Grace Barbé
 Label of the Year - Rhubarb Records
 Golden WAMi - Nigel Bird (WAM)

Craft awards 
 Best Bassist – Kate Pass and Roy Martinez
 Best Brass/String/Woodwind Instrumentalist – Ricki Malet (Trumpet)
 Best Drummer/Percussionist – Talya Valenti
 Best Electronic Producer – Feels
 Best Guitarist – Carla Geneve 
 Best Keys/Synth Artist – Harry Mitchell
 Best Live Sound Engineer – Chris Wright
 Best Studio Sound Engineer/Producer – Broderick Madden-Scott 
 Best Vocalist – Grace Barbé

2020 Awards
The 2020 Awards took place in March 2021. The winners were:

Public voted awards 
 Most Popular Act - Spacey Jane
 Most Popular New Act - Electric State
 Most Popular Live Act - Electric State
 Most Popular Venue - Mojos Bar
 Most Popular Live or Streaming Music Event - Nannup Music Festival

Genre and Industry awards 
 Best Album – The Slow Rush by Tame Impala and Sunlight by Spacey Jane
 Best EP – Everything Melts by Noah Dillon
 Best Single – "Booster Seat" by Spacey Jane
 Best Music Video – "Mr. Prism" by Psychedelic Porn Crumpets  
 Best Blues / Roots Act – Matty T Wall
 Best Country Act – Siobhan Cotchin
 Best Experimental Act – Rachael Dease
 Best Folk Act – Jack Davies & the Bush Chooks
 Best Hip-Hop Act – Adrian Dzvuke
 Best Indigenous Act – MissGenius
 Best Jazz Act – Daniel Susnjar Afro-Peruvian Jazz Group
 Best Live Electronic Act – Your Girl Pho, BEXX
 Best Metal / Heavy Act – Bolt Gun
 Best Pop Act – Spacey Jane
 Best Punk / Hardcore Act – Dennis Cometti
 Best Regional Act – Tanya Ransom
 Best Rock Act – The Southern River Band
 Best R&B/Funk/Soul Act – Grievous Bodily Calm
 Best Global Music Act – Grace Barbé
 Label of the Year – Blue Grey Pink
 Golden WAMi – Will Backler (RTRFM)

Craft awards
 Best Bassist  – Grace Barbé
 Best Brass/String/Woodwind Instrumentalist – Gemma Farrell 
 Best Drummer/Percussionist – Talya Valenti
 Best Electronic Producer – SLUMBERJACK
 Best Guitarist – Guy Ghouse 
 Best Keys/Synth Artist – Josiah Padmanabham
 Best Live Sound Engineer – Jeremy Beste
 Best Studio Sound Engineer/Producer – Andy Lawson
 Best Vocalist – Grace Barbé

See also
 WAM Song of the Year

References

External links
 

2001 establishments in Australia
Australian music awards
Culture of Western Australia
Music competitions in Australia